Khe Aab Mountain is a mountain in Kukherd Rural District, Kukherd District, Bastak County,  the Hormozgan Province in the south of Iran. It is in the Kukherd District in the  city of Bastak, (Bastak County شهرستان بستک) in Hormozgan Province.

See also 
Dasak Mountain
List of mountains in Iran
Nakh Mountain
The Historic Bath of Siba
Zeer Mountain

References 

Sources
 Peter Jackson and Lawrence Lockhart (Ed) (1986), Vol. 6th,  The Cambridge History of Iran: Cambridge University Press
 الكوخردى ، محمد ، بن يوسف، (كُوخِرد حَاضِرَة اِسلامِيةَ عَلي ضِفافِ نَهر مِهران) الطبعة الثالثة ،دبى: سنة 199۷ للميلاد Mohammed Kookherdi (1997) Kookherd, an Islamic civil at Mehran river,  third edition: Dubai
 محمدیان، کوخری، محمد ، “ (به یاد کوخرد) “، ج1. ج2. چاپ اول، دبی: سال انتشار 2003 میلادی Mohammed Kookherdi Mohammadyan (2003), Beyade Kookherd, third edition : Dubai.
 محمدیان، کوخردی ، محمد ،  «شهرستان بستک و بخش کوخرد»  ، ج۱. چاپ اول، دبی: سال انتشار ۲۰۰۵ میلادی Mohammed Kookherdi Mohammadyan (2005), Shahrestan  Bastak & Bakhshe Kookherd, First edition : Dubai.
 عباسی ، قلی، مصطفی،  «بستک وجهانگیریه»، چاپ اول، تهران : ناشر: شرکت انتشارات جهان
 سلامى، بستكى، احمد.  (بستک در گذرگاه تاریخ)  ج2 چاپ اول، 1372 خورشيدى
 اطلس گیتاشناسی استان‌های ایران [Atlas Gitashenasi Ostanhai Iran] (Gitashenasi Province Atlas of Iran)
 محمدیان، کوخری، محمد. (کوخرد سرزمین شاعران)  ج1. چاپ اول، دبی: سال انتشار 200۵ میلادی Mohammed Kookherdi Mohammadyan (2005), Sarzamin Shaaran, First edition : Dubai.

Kukherd District
Bastak County
Mountains of Hormozgan Province
Mountains of Iran